Parliamentary elections were held in Armenia on 25 May 2003. There were 56 constituency seats and 75 elected on a national basis using proportional representation. They saw the Republican Party of Armenia emerge as the largest party, with 33 of the 131 seats. However, the elections were strongly criticized by international election monitors, who cited widespread fraud and noted that they fell short of democratic standards.

Results

References

Armenia
Parliamentary
Parliamentary elections in Armenia
2000s in Armenian politics
Election and referendum articles with incomplete results